Roger Crézen (16 April 1911 – 1 April 1995) was a French rower. He competed in the men's coxed pair event at the 1948 Summer Olympics.

References

External links

1911 births
1995 deaths
French male rowers
Olympic rowers of France
Rowers at the 1948 Summer Olympics
20th-century French people